Straparollinidae is an extinct taxonomic family of fossil sea snails, marine gastropod molluscs.

Straparollinidae is the only family in the superfamily Straparollinoidea.

This family has no subfamilies.

References

Prehistoric gastropods